Carl Eugen Langen (9 October 1833 in Cologne – 2 October 1895 in Elsdorf) was a German entrepreneur, engineer and inventor, involved in the development of the petrol engine and the Wuppertal Suspension Railway. In 1857 he worked in his father's sugar factory, JJ Langen & Söhne, and after extensive technical training at the Polytechnic institute in Karlsruhe, patented a method for producing sugar cubes. He sold this method in 1872 to Sir Henry Tate of England, founder of the Tate Gallery in London.

Otto and Langen
In 1864, Langen met Nicolaus August Otto who was working to improve to the gas engine invented by Belgian Etienne Lenoir. The technically–trained Langen recognized the potential of Otto's development, and one month after the meeting, founded the first engine factory in the world, NA Otto & Cie. At the 1867 Paris World Exhibition, their improved engine received the Grand Prize.

Deutz
After this first factory went bankrupt, Langen founded a new company for the construction of gas engines, Gasmotoren-Fabrik Deutz, which later became the group Kloeckner-Humboldt-Deutz (KHD).  This became the current Deutz AG. Langen invented and applied new methods of production in the KHD factory.

Railway equipment
In the field of rail transport equipment, Langen was co-owner and engineer of the Cologne Waggonfabrik van der Zypen & Charlier. He started the suspension railway system in Wuppertal in 1894.

See also
 German inventors and discoverers

References

1833 births
1895 deaths
19th-century German inventors
German industrialists
19th-century German businesspeople
People associated with the internal combustion engine
Wuppertal Schwebebahn
Businesspeople from Cologne